The lawn bowls competition at the 1954 British Empire and Commonwealth Games took place in Vancouver, British Columbia, Canada from 30 July until 7 August 1954. The host clubs were the West Point Grey Lawn Bowling Club of Vancouver and the New Westminster Bowling Club of New Westminster.

Medal table

Medallists

Results

Men's singles – round robin

Results

Men's pairs – round robin

Results

Men's Fours - Round Robin

Results

References

See also
List of Commonwealth Games medallists in lawn bowls
Lawn bowls at the Commonwealth Games

Lawn bowls at the Commonwealth Games
Brit